Anouk Grinberg (born 20 March 1963) is a French actress. She is the daughter of Michel Vinaver, born Michel Grinberg, a French writer and dramatist, and the great-granddaughter of the pre-1917 Russian politician Maxim Vinaver.

She has appeared in more than 40 films and television shows since 1976. In 1996, she won the Silver Bear for Best Actress at the 46th Berlin International Film Festival for her role in the film Mon Homme.

Personal life
She lived with Bertrand Blier and had a son together. Her niece, Louise Grinberg, is also an actress.

Theater

Filmography

References

External links

1963 births
Living people
French film actresses
People from Uccle
Silver Bear for Best Actress winners
French television actresses
20th-century French actresses
21st-century French actresses
Audiobook narrators